This is a list of Sheriffs of Berkshire and Oxfordshire. One sheriff was appointed for both counties from 1248 until the end of 1566 (except for 1258–1259), after which separate sheriffs were appointed. See High Sheriff of Berkshire and High Sheriff of Oxfordshire for dates before 1248 or after 1566.

1248–1299

1300–1399

1400–1499

1500–1566

See also
 High Sheriff of Berkshire
 High Sheriff of Oxfordshire

References

Bibliography

Berkshire and Oxfordshire
Lists of office-holders in the United Kingdom
History of Berkshire
History of Oxfordshire